Constantine, Kentucky is an unincorporated community in Breckinridge County, Kentucky.

References

External links
Constantine Populated Place Profile

Unincorporated communities in Breckinridge County, Kentucky
Unincorporated communities in Kentucky